The Society for American Baseball Research (SABR) is a membership organization dedicated to fostering the research and dissemination of the history and record of baseball, primarily through the use of statistics. The organization was founded in Cooperstown, New York, on August 10, 1971, at a meeting of 16 “statistorians” coordinated by sportswriter Bob Davids. The organization now reports a membership of over 7,000 and is based in Phoenix, Arizona.

Membership
While the acronym "SABR" was used to coin the word sabermetrics (for the use of sophisticated mathematical tools to analyze baseball), the Society is about much more than statistics.  Well-known figures in the baseball world such as Bob Costas, Keith Olbermann, Craig R. Wright, and Rollie Hemond are members, along with highly regarded "sabermetricians" such as Bill James and Rob Neyer.

Among Major League players Jeff Bajenaru was believed to have been (until 2006) the only active player with a SABR membership; Elden Auker, Larry Dierker, and Andy Seminick also have been involved.

Some prominent SABR members include:

 Bob Davids, founder (deceased)
 Bob McConnell, Home Run Log (deceased)
 Bill Carle, Biographical Committee
 Bill James, analyst, writer
 Larry Lester, Negro Leagues Committee 
 Ron Liebman, Historial Stats & Trivia
 David Neft, writer, historian, encyclopedist
 David Nemec, prolific writer
 Rob Neyer, analyst, journalist
 Pete Palmer, analyst, encyclopedist
 Dave Smith, analyst, Retrosheet founder
 Lyle Spatz, Records Committee
 John Thorn, historian, encyclopedist
 Robert L. Tiemann, historian
 Monte Irvin, Hall of Famer and former Negro Leagues star
 David W. Vincent, Home Run Log
 Larry Dierker, former Major League All-Star pitcher

Activities
Only a minority of members pursue "number crunching" research.  Rather, the SABR community is organized both by interest and geography:

Research Committees study a particular issue
Regional Chapters link members by proximity.  The latter are frequently named after baseball personalities relevant to their region.
 Biography Project, with members authoring well-researched and engaging biographies of a growing list of former big league ballplayers and other notable contributors to the game.

SABR members keep in touch through online directories and electronic mailing lists set up through the SABR headquarters. The headquarters also maintains a number of research tools on its website, including a lending library, home run and triple play logs, and course syllabi related to the game.

SABR holds annual conventions in a different city each year.  The conference generally includes panel discussions, research presentations, city-specific tourism, a ballgame, and an awards banquet. The 2007 convention in St. Louis, Missouri, set the attendance record with 726 registered attendees out of approximately 7,000 SABR members. The organization also hosts an annual baseball analytics conference in Phoenix and a Negro Leagues conference, which is held in a different location each year.

Publications 
The Baseball Research Journal (BRJ) is SABR's flagship publication since 1972 for members to publish and share their research with like-minded students of baseball. The National Pastime is an annual, published from 1982 to 2008 as The National Pastime: A Review of Baseball History, when it was intended as a more literary outlet than the stats oriented BRJ; since 2009 it is a convention-focused journal, with articles about the geographic region where the convention is taking place that year. Other Society publications are an increasing variety of books (since 1976) and ebooks (since 2011); 8–10 new e-books published annually are all free to members.

Awards

SABR annual awards include:
 Bob Davids Award: for exceptional SABR members who have made contributions to SABR and baseball that reflect ingenuity, integrity, and self-sacrifice.  It is SABR's highest honor, and was established in 1985.
 Henry Chadwick Award: for baseball researchers—historians, statisticians, annalists, and archivists.
 Seymour Medal: best book of baseball history or biography published during the preceding calendar year.
 McFarland-SABR Baseball Research Award: for authors of the best articles on baseball history or biography completed during the preceding calendar year (published or unpublished).
 Sporting News-SABR Baseball Research Award: for projects which do not fit the criteria for The Seymour Medal or the McFarland-SABR Award.
 Jerry Malloy Book Prize: best book-length nonfiction manuscript submitted by a member of SABR.
 Doug Pappas Research Award: best oral research presentation at the Annual Convention.
 Lee Allen Award: for the best baseball research project at the annual National History Day competition.
 Jack Kavanagh Memorial Youth Baseball Research Award: research paper by a researcher in grades 6–8 (middle school category), grades 9–12 (high school category), or undergraduates 22 and under (College Category).

In 2013, SABR began collaborating with Rawlings on the Gold Glove Award. Rawlings changed the voting process to incorporate SABR Defensive Index, a sabermetric component provided by SABR, which accounts for approximately 25 percent of the vote for the defensive award.

Research committees

Asian Baseball
Ballparks
Baseball and the Arts
Baseball and the Media
Baseball Card History and Influence
Baseball Index Project
Baseball Records
Biographical Research
BioProject
Black Sox Scandal
Business of Baseball
Collegiate Baseball
Concessions
Deadball Era (1901–1919)
Educational Resources
Games and Simulation
Games Project
Latino Baseball
Minor Leagues
Negro Leagues
19th Century
Official Scoring
Oral History
Origins
Pictorial History
Retrosheet
Science and Baseball
Scouts
Spring training
Statistical Analysis
Umpires
Women in Baseball

Retrosheet  is a research and archives organization independent of SABR which holds its annual meeting in conjunction with the society's annual convention.

Regional chapters

Allan Roth – Los Angeles
Auker–Seminick – Orlando, Florida
Bob Broeg – St. Louis, Missouri
Bob Davids – Washington, D.C. & Baltimore, Maryland (Chapter Web site)
Bobby Thomson – Great Britain
SABRBoston – Boston, Massachusetts
Bresnahan–Mud Hens – Toledo, Ohio
Carolina – North Carolina
Casey Stengel – New York City
Connie Mack – Philadelphia 
Dayton, Ohio
Don Lund – Ann Arbor, Michigan
Elysian Fields – Northern New Jersey
Emil Rothe – Chicago
Field of Dreams – Iowa
Flame Delhi – Phoenix, Arizona
Flip Valentini- Louisville
Forbes Field – Pittsburgh, Pennsylvania
Ford–Harrelson – Long Island, New York
Gardner-Waterman – Vermont
Hall-Ruggles – Dallas, Texas
Halsey Hall – Minnesota
Hank Gowdy- Columbus, Ohio
Hanlan's Point – Toronto
Hoyt–Allen – Cincinnati
Jack Graney – Cleveland, Ohio
Jesse Burkett – Worcester, Massachusetts 
Jim O'Rourke – Bridgeport, Connecticut
Ken Keltner – Wisconsin
Lajoie–Start – Providence, Rhode Island
Larry Dierker – Houston, Texas (Chapter Web site)
Leatherstocking – Cooperstown, New York
Lefty O'Doul – San Francisco, California
Lou Criger – South Bend, Indiana
Magnolia – Atlanta
Monarchs – Kansas City, Missouri
Montreal
NWSABR – Seattle, Washington
Orlando Cepeda – San Juan
Oscar Charleston – Indianapolis, Indiana
Pee Wee Reese – Louisville, Kentucky
Rabbit Maranville – Springfield, Massachusetts
Robinson–Kell – Little Rock, Arkansas
Rocky Mountain SABR – Denver, Colorado
Rogers Hornsby – Austin, Texas
Sacramento, California
Schott-Pelican – New Orleans, Louisiana
Seymour-Mills – Southwest Florida
Smoky Joe Wood – Connecticut
South Carolina
South Florida – Miami, Florida
Ted Williams – San Diego
Tennessee – Nashville, Tennessee
Tokyo
Wade Boggs – Tampa, Florida
Wally Pipp – Western Michigan
West Texas – Abilene, Texas
Luis Castro – Maracaibo, Venezuela
Mathewson-Plank – Harrisburg, Pennsylvania

Past convention sites and keynote speakers

1971   Cooperstown, New York; none
1972   Washington, D.C.; Chuck Hinton
1973   Chicago; Bob Elson and Dave Malarcher
1974   Philadelphia, Pennsylvania; Fred Lieb, Gene Kelly, and Ted Page
1975   Boston, Massachusetts; Joe Dugan
1976   Chicago, Illinois; Lew Fonseca
1977   Columbus, Ohio; Johnny Bucha
1978   Paramus, New Jersey; Tony Lupien
1979   St. Louis, Missouri; Mike Shannon
1980   Los Angeles, California; Roy Smalley
1981   Toronto, Ontario; none
1982   Baltimore, Maryland; Sparky Anderson
1983   Milwaukee, Wisconsin; Hal Goodenough
1984   Providence, Rhode Island; Lou Gorman
1985   Oakland, California; Roy Eisenhardt
1986   Chicago, Illinois; Bill Gleason
1987   Washington, D.C.; John Steadman
1988   Minneapolis, Minnesota; Andy MacPhail
1989   Albany, New York; Bobby Brown
1990   Cleveland, Ohio; Sam McDowell
1991   New York City; Mel Allen
1992   St. Louis, Missouri; Bing Devine
1993   San Diego, California; Dick Williams
1994   Arlington, Texas; Robin Roberts
1995   Pittsburgh, Pennsylvania; Chuck Tanner
1996   Kansas City, Missouri; Don Fehr
1997   Louisville, Kentucky; Jim Bunning
1998   San Mateo, California; Bill Rigney
1999   Scottsdale, Arizona; Tommy Henrich
2000   West Palm Beach, Florida; Elden Auker
2001   Milwaukee, Wisconsin; Bud Selig
2002   Boston, Massachusetts; Dom DiMaggio and Johnny Pesky
2003   Denver, Colorado; Jim Evans
2004   Cincinnati; Marvin Miller
2005   Toronto; Paul Godfrey
2006   Seattle; Jim Bouton
2007   St. Louis, Missouri; Joe Garagiola
2008   Cleveland, Ohio; Ron Shapiro
2009   Washington, D.C.;  Josh Alkin (MLB lobbyist)
2010   Atlanta; John Schuerholz
2011   Long Beach, California; Scott Boras
2012   Minneapolis; John Thorn
2013   Philadelphia; Larry Bowa
2014   Houston; Larry Dierker
2015   Chicago; Ernie Banks/Minnie Miñoso tribute
2016   Miami, Florida; ballpark session with Barry Bonds, Don Mattingly, Andre Dawson, and Tony Perez
2017   New York City; ballpark session with Sandy Alderson, Tom Goodwin, Wayne Randazzo, Steve Gelbs, and Josh Lewin
2018   Pittsburgh; ballpark session with Clint Hurdle, Neal Huntington, Dan Fox, Joe Block, and Thomas E. Kennedy
2019   San Diego, California
2022   Baltimore, Maryland

Source: SABR Convention History – Society for American Baseball Research.

See also

Baseball statistics
Retrosheet
Esurance MLB Awards
Professional Football Researchers Association

References

Notes

Bibliography

External links
 

Baseball statistics
Baseball culture
Baseball mass media
Baseball organizations
History of baseball
Organizations based in Phoenix, Arizona
Sports organizations established in 1971